Camfrog is a video chat and instant messaging client that was created by Camshare in October 2003. The app allows users to contact others worldwide and find or even create chat rooms to create communities that largely share similar interests. 

Over 150K audio and video calls occur and 72 years of video is watched daily.

Updates:

Users have been able to send Virtual Gifts since Camfrog's 2008 update. 

On October 19, 2010, it was announced that Paltalk acquired Camfrog.  

In 2015, A new software called Ribbit was introduced, which allows users to meet others by swiping through live videos.

References

Online chat
Videotelephony
2003 software
Proprietary cross-platform software
Video software